In abstract algebra, if I and J are ideals of a commutative ring R, their ideal quotient (I : J) is the set

Then (I : J) is itself an ideal in R. The ideal quotient is viewed as a quotient because  if and only if . The ideal quotient is useful for calculating primary decompositions. It also arises in the description of the set difference in algebraic geometry (see below).

(I : J) is sometimes referred to as a colon ideal because of the notation. In the context of fractional ideals, there is a related notion of the inverse of a fractional ideal.

Properties
The ideal quotient satisfies the following properties:
 (in particular)

 (as long as R is an integral domain)

Calculating the quotient
The above properties can be used to calculate the quotient of ideals in a polynomial ring given their generators. For example, if I = (f1, f2, f3) and J = (g1, g2) are ideals in k[x1, ..., xn], then

Then elimination theory can be used to calculate the intersection of I with (g1) and (g2):

Then the basis functions which have no t in them generate .

Geometric interpretation
The ideal quotient corresponds to set difference in algebraic geometry. More precisely,
If W is an affine variety (not necessarily irreducible) and V is a subset of the affine space (not necessarily a variety), then

where  denotes the taking of the ideal associated to a subset.

If I and J are ideals in k[x1, ..., xn], with k an algebraically closed field and I radical then

where  denotes the Zariski closure, and  denotes the taking of the variety defined by an ideal. If I is not radical, then the same property holds if we saturate the ideal J:

where .

Examples 
 In , 
 In algebraic number theory, the ideal quotient is useful while studying fractional ideals. This is because the inverse of any invertible fractional ideal  of an integral domain  is given by the ideal quotient .
 One geometric application of the ideal quotient is removing an irreducible component of an affine scheme. This shows how the ideal quotient can be used to "delete" irreducible subschemes.
 A useful scheme theoretic example is taking the ideal quotient of a reducible ideal. For example, the ideal quotient , showing that the ideal quotient of a subscheme of some non-reduced scheme, where both have the same reduced subscheme, kills off some of the non-reduced structure.
 We can use the previous example to find the saturation of an ideal corresponding to a projective scheme.

References

 Viviana Ene, Jürgen Herzog: 'Gröbner Bases in Commutative Algebra', AMS Graduate Studies in Mathematics, Vol 130 (AMS 2012)

 M.F.Atiyah, I.G.MacDonald: 'Introduction to Commutative Algebra', Addison-Wesley 1969.

Ideals (ring theory)